Osonye Tess Onwueme, also known as T. Akaeke Onwueme (born 8 September 1955) is a Nigerian playwright, scholar and poet, who rose to prominence writing plays with themes of social justice, culture, and the environment. In 2010, she became the university Professor of Global Letters, following her exceptional service as Distinguished Professor of Cultural Diversity and English at the University of Wisconsin–Eau Claire. Through her plays, she is able to use the theatre as a medium to showcase historically silenced views such as African women, and shedding more light on African life. She sustains her advocacy for the global poor and youth, along with the experiences and concerns of the African Diaspora in her creative work. In 2007, the U.S. State Department appointed her to the Public Diplomacy Speaker Program for North, East, and West India. The 2009 Tess International Conference: Staging Women, Youth, Globalization, and Eco-Literature, which was exclusively devoted to the author's work, was successfully held by international scholars in the Nigerian capital, Abuja, following the Fonlon-Nichols award to the dramatist. She is regarded as one of the band of more important African authors. She also is an active speaker regarding domestic violence.

Early life and education
After secondary education, she married an agronomist, I. C. Onwueme, and bore five children, during the time she attended the University of Ife, for her bachelor's degree in education (1979) and master's in literature (1982). She obtained her PhD at the University of Benin, studying African Drama. In 1998 she married Obika Gray, a Jamaican political scientist.

Works

 A Hen Too Soon (1983)
 Broken Calabash (1984) 
 The Desert Encroaches (1985) 
 The Reign of Wazobia (1988)
 Ban Empty Barn and other plays (1986)
 Legacies (1989)
 Three Plays: an anthology of plays by Tess Onwueme (1993)
 Tell It To Women: an epic drama (1995).
 Riot In Heaven: drama for the voices of color (1996; 2006)
 The Missing Face, a play (1997; 2000)
 Shakara: Dance-Hall Queen: a play (2000; 2006)
 Then She Said It: a play (2003)
 What Mama Said, an epic drama (2004)
 No Vacancy (2005)

Awards 
She has won several international awards, including: the prestigious Fonlon-Nichols award (2009), the Phyllis Wheatley/Nwapa award for outstanding black writers (2008), the Martin Luther King, Jr./Caeser Chavez Distinguished Writers Award (1989/90), the Distinguished Authors Award (1988), and the Association of Nigerian Authors Drama Prize, which she has won several times with plays such as The Desert Encroaches (1985), Tell It To Women (1995), Shakara: Dance-Hall Queen (2001), Then She Said it (2003), among numerous honors and international productions of her drama.

References

Further reading
 Simon Gikandi, Encyclopedia of African Literature, Routledge (2002),  - pp. 414–15 
 Ini Uko, Gender and Identity in the Works of Tess Onwueme, Trenton, New Jersey: Africa World Press, 2004
Chris Dunton, "Nigeria and the Diaspora, Solidarities and Discords: The Drama of Tess Onwueme", in Toyin Falola (ed.), Nigeria in the Twentieth Century. Durham, North Carolina. Carolina Academic Press, 2002. pp. 791–798
Therese Migraine-George, "African Women on the Global Stage", African Women and Representation: From Performance to Politics. Trenton: Africa World Press, 2008. pp. 157–178.
Kanika Batra, "Daughters who Know the Language of Power: Community, Sexuality, and Postcolonial Development In Tess Onwueme's Tell it to Women," Interventions: Journal of Postcolonial Studies, Vol. 9, 1 (2007), 124–138, (ISSN 1369-801X print/1469-929X online)
J. O. J. Nwachukwu-Agbada, "Tess Onwueme: Dramatist In Quest of Change", World Literature Today (Summer 1992), 464–467.

External links
Dr. Osonye Tess Onwueme's website

Nigerian dramatists and playwrights
1955 births
Living people
University of Wisconsin–Eau Claire faculty
People from Delta State
Obafemi Awolowo University alumni
Women dramatists and playwrights
University of Benin (Nigeria) alumni
20th-century Nigerian writers
21st-century Nigerian writers
Nigerian expatriate academics in the United States
20th-century Nigerian women writers
21st-century Nigerian women writers